Lamprosema pelealis is a moth in the family Crambidae. It was described by Francis Walker in 1859. It is found in the Dominican Republic, Brazil and Venezuela.

References

Moths described in 1859
Lamprosema
Moths of the Caribbean
Moths of South America